The Thoroughgood House is a brick house located at 1636 Parish Road, in the neighborhood of Thoroughgood, in Virginia Beach, Virginia, United States. It was built ca. 1719. It was formerly known as the Adam Thoroughgood House. It was not built by Adam. The building underwent major restorations in 1923 and in the 1950s and has served as a museum since opening to the public April 29, 1957. Much of the current structure was most likely the house of the great-grandson of Adam Thoroughgood. The City of Virginia Beach acquired the property in 2003. A 2004 grant application to the National Park Service resulted in a $150,000 award from the prestigious Save America's Treasures program. The City matched that amount as required. This restoration took longer and cost more than expected, but the house reopened in May 2011.

Adam Thoroughgood

Adam Thoroughgood was from King's Lynn, Norfolk, England, and the naming of many local features can be traced back to his childhood home, including the Lynnhaven River, the City of Norfolk, and Norfolk County and the City of South Norfolk (the last two of which combined to become the new City of Chesapeake in 1963).

Historic designations

It was designated a National Historic Landmark in 1960, as a prime example of early colonial architecture in Virginia.  It was listed in the US National Register of Historic Places in 1966.

Another nearby surviving early 18th-century house in Virginia Beach is the Adam Keeling House.

See also
 List of the oldest buildings in Virginia
 National Register of Historic Places listings in Virginia Beach, Virginia

References

External links

Adam Thoroughgood House (Official Website)
wwwVBgov.com
Adam Thoroughgood House, 1636 Parish Road (Thoroughgood Road), Virginia Beach, Virginia Beach, VA: 3 photos, 9 measured drawings, 5 data pages, and 1 photo caption page at Historic American Buildings Survey
Virginia National Historic Landmarks

Central-passage houses
Historic American Buildings Survey in Virginia
Historic house museums in Virginia
Houses in Virginia Beach, Virginia
Houses on the National Register of Historic Places in Virginia
Museums in Virginia Beach, Virginia
National Historic Landmarks in Virginia
National Register of Historic Places in Virginia Beach, Virginia